Souvenir is a 1989 British drama film directed by Geoffrey Reeve and starring Christopher Plummer, Catherine Hicks and Michael Lonsdale. It was based on the novel The Pork Butcher by David Hughes. Forty years after the Second World War, an ex-German soldier returns as an American to a French village in which atrocities were committed by the Nazis, during which his then French lover was murdered. The film, like the book, is an attempt to attribute and assuage patent and discreet levels of guilt.

Cast
 Christopher Plummer ...  Ernst Kestner
 Catherine Hicks ...  Tina Boyer
 Michael Lonsdale ...  Xavier Lorion
 Christopher Cazenove ...  William Root
 Patrick Bailey ...  Young Ernst Kestner
 Jean Badin ...  Henri Boyer
 Lisa Daniely ...  Mme. Lorion
 Amélie Pick ...  Janni

References

External links

1987 films
1987 drama films
Films directed by Geoffrey Reeve
British drama films
British World War II films
1980s English-language films
1980s British films